Beatrice is an unincorporated community in Stewart County, in the U.S. state of Georgia.

History
A post office called Beatrice was established in 1900, and remained in operation until 1905. The community was located inland away from railroads.

References

Unincorporated communities in Stewart County, Georgia